This is a list of hospitals in Qatar.
  Naseem Healthcare
 Queen Hospital
 Doha Clinic Hospital
 Aster Hospital
 Al Khor Hospital
 Al Wakrah Hospital 
 Communicable Disease Center
 The Cuban Hospital 
 Enaya Specialized Care Center 
 Hamad General Hospital 
 National Center for Cancer Care and Research (NCCCR) 
 Qatar Rehabilitation Institute 
 Rumeilah Hospital 
 Al-Ahli Hospital 
 Al Emadi Hospital  
 Hazm Mebaireek General Hospital 

Doha
 Sidra Medical and Research Center

Veterinary Hospitals
 Souq Waqif Falcon Hospital

References

External links
 Ministry of Public Health - Qatar Health System
 Health Facilities

Qatar
List
Hospitalsi
Qatar